Carl Maddox was the athletics director of Louisiana State University (1968–1978) and Mississippi State University (1979–1983). The Carl Maddox Field House at LSU is named after him along with the Carl Maddox Track and Field Complex at Mississippi State.

Honors and awards

Carl Maddox Sport Management Award
See: Carl Maddox Sport Management Award
The Carl Maddox Sport Management Award is presented annually at the United States Sports Academy.

Corbett Award
Maddox was awarded the Corbett Award in 1986. The Corbett Award is presented annually "to the collegiate administrator who through the years has most typified Corbett's devotion to intercollegiate athletics and worked unceasingly for its betterment."

References

External links
 Carl Maddox Field House @ LSUSports.net

LSU Tigers football coaches
LSU Tigers and Lady Tigers athletic directors
Mississippi State Bulldogs athletic directors